Procas is a genus of marsh weevils in the family of beetles known as Brachyceridae. There are at least 20 described species in Procas.

Species
These 28 species belong to the genus Procas:

 Procas alepensis Pic, 1915 c
 Procas alternans Klima, 1934 c
 Procas antoinei Klima, 1934 c
 Procas antoniei Klima, 1934 c
 Procas biguttatus Faust, 1882 c
 Procas bruleriei Klima, 1934 c
 Procas cottyi Perris, 1864 c
 Procas fastidiosus Pic, 1904 c
 Procas granulicollis Walton, 1848 c
 Procas lecontei Bedel, 1879 i g b
 Procas lethierryi Chevrolat, 1860 c
 Procas levantinus Thompson, 2006 c
 Procas maculatus Klima, 1934 c
 Procas michaelis Thompson, 2006 c
 Procas milleri Pic, M., 1901 c g
 Procas minutus Desbrochers, 1893 c
 Procas picipes Stephens, 1831 c
 Procas putoni Tournier, 1874 c
 Procas pyrrhodactylus Stephens, 1831 c
 Procas rasus Desbrochers, 1897 c
 Procas rufescens Klima, 1934 c
 Procas saulcyi Reiche & Saulcy, 1857 c
 Procas semihispidus Pic, M., 1901 c g
 Procas sibiricus Pic, 1904 c
 Procas siccensis Normand, 1951 c
 Procas steveni Schoenherr, 1842 c
 Procas testaceus Bajtenov, 1974 c
 Procas verberatus Scudder, 1893 c

Data sources: i = ITIS, c = Catalogue of Life, g = GBIF, b = Bugguide.net

References

Further reading

External links

 

Brachyceridae
Articles created by Qbugbot